|-
| Carev Do 
| Fojnica
|
|-
| Carevo Polje 
| Jajce
|
|-
| Carica 
| Busovača
|
|-
| Cazin
| 
|
|-
| Cebara 
| Tomislavgrad
|
|-
| Ceribašići 
| Bugojno
|
|-
| Cerići
| 
|
|-
| Cerno
| 
|
|-
| Crnac 
| Bosansko Grahovo
|
|-
| Crne Lokve 
| Široki Brijeg
|
|-
| Crni Lug 
| Bosansko Grahovo
|
|-
| Crni Vrh 
| Glamoč
|
|-
| Crni Vrh 
| Konjic
|
|-
| Crniče 
| Bugojno
|
|-
| Crkvenjak 
| Kreševo
|
|-
| Crkvice 
| Uskoplje
|
|-
| Crnički Kamenik 
| Kreševo
|
|-
| Crnići 
| Čapljina
|
|-
| Crnići 
| Kreševo
|
|-
| Crnići-Greda 
| Stolac
|
|-
| Crnići-Kula 
| Stolac
|
|-
| Crnopod
| 
|
|-
| Crveni Grm
| 
|
|-
| Crvenice 
| Tomislavgrad
|
|-
| Crvica
| Goražde
|
|-
| Cvilin (part)
| 
|
|-
| Cvitović 
| Jajce
|
|-
| Cvrče 
| Uskoplje
|
|}

Lists of settlements in the Federation of Bosnia and Herzegovina (A-Ž)